Samuel Lloyd Milby (born May 23, 1984) is a Filipino-American actor, musician, guitarist, model, recording artist, and businessman. In 2005, Milby decided to seriously pursue a career in show business and modeling.

Biography
Samuel Lloyd Milby was born on May 23, 1984, in Troy, Ohio, the youngest child of Elsie Ronquillo Lacia (born March 15, 1958, Tago, Surigao del Sur), and Lloyd William Milby (born October 21, 1934, Dayton, Ohio – died November 1, 2021, Tipp City, Ohio), an entrepreneur.

Milby was raised in Tipp City, Ohio. At age 9, he trained and lived with his ice-skating coach, and was home schooled until he was 15.  He competed in numerous major ice skating competitions, including the Junior Nationals. He and his skating partner of four years won silver and other awards in the course of his serious skating stint.

Returning to the Philippines in 2005, Milby decided to seriously pursue a career in show business and modeling. He landed bit roles in some ads before obtaining a lead role in Close Up's TV commercial with Barbie Almalbis. He subsequently joined Pinoy Big Brother, which featured 12 men and women from different walks of life; Milby was not one of the original 12, but joined the cast when one of the contestants left the house. After this, he became an actor and recording artist and signed a contract with ABS-CBN. His first major film debut was Close to You, produced by ABS-CBN subsidiary Star Cinema and co-starring John Lloyd Cruz and Bea Alonzo.

In early 2006, Milby released a self-titled debut album.  His concert, titled "Heartthrobs", was performed at the Music Museum on February 2 and 3, 2007. It was repeated on March 17, 2007, following the big success of the first concert. His first major solo concert, "Sam Milby: Rockoustic Heartthrob", occurred at the Aliw Theater on October 25, 2008. He also performed in several concerts in USA, Canada, Asia, and Europe.

In 2012, Milby spent three months in the United States, taking part in auditions in New York.  He also performed in concerts and tours, playing Lazarus for one night in the Broadway musical Godspell, and guest-starring in Anna Maria's Benefit Concert in New York with Anna Maria's Godspell costars Corbin Bleu, Wallace Smith, Nick Blaemire, Eric Krop, and George Salazar.

In 2013 Milby joined PETA campaign to remove Mali, the only captive elephant in the Philippines, from the Manila zoo, and have her transferred to Boon Lott's Elephant Sanctuary in Thailand.

Milby took part in the Cannes Film Festival in 2013, where the Adolfo Alix Jr. movie Death March, in which he had acted, was screened in Un Certain Regard section.

Personal life
On May 23, 2020, Milby revealed that he is in a relationship with Miss Universe 2018, Catriona Gray. They announced their engagement on February 16, 2023, in a social media post.

Discography

Albums
Sam Milby (2006, Star Music)
A Little Too Perfect (2007, Star Music)
Love Duets (2009, Star Music; collaboration with Toni Gonzaga)
Be Mine (2011, Star Music)
Sam:12 (2017, Star Music)

Other appearances
2006, "Langit Na Naman", on Hotsilog: The ASAP Hotdog Compilation
2007, "You and I," "Can't Cry Hard Enough," "In Love with You", on Maging Sino Ka Man Soundtrack
2012, "After All" on "A Beautiful Affair OST"
2014, "And I Love You So", "Chasing Cars" on Star Cinema (20th Year Commemorative Album)

Filmography

Television

Movies

Awards and nominations

Notes

References

External links

 

1984 births
Living people
American male actors of Filipino descent
Male models from Ohio
American male pop singers
American models of Filipino descent
21st-century Filipino male singers
Filipino male television actors
Filipino people of American descent
Pinoy Big Brother contestants
People from Troy, Ohio
Male actors from Ohio
21st-century American male actors
21st-century Filipino male actors
ABS-CBN personalities
Viva Artists Agency
People from Tipp City, Ohio
21st-century American male singers
21st-century American singers
Filipino male film actors
Star Music artists
Filipino male pop singers